Mid and East Antrim is a local government district in Northern Ireland. The district was created on 1 April 2015 by merging the Borough of Ballymena, the Borough of Larne and the Borough of Carrickfergus. The local authority is Mid and East Antrim Borough Council.

Geography

The district is wholly located in County Antrim, and stretches from the River Bann in the west to the Antrim Coast, taking in the southern part of the Antrim Coast and Glens Area of Outstanding Natural Beauty, as well as the major towns of Ballymena and Carrickfergus, and the important port of Larne. The name of the new district was announced on 17 September 2008.

History

Mid and East Antrim Borough Council replaced Ballymena Borough Council, Carrickfergus Borough Council and Larne Borough Council. The first election for the new district council was originally due to take place in May 2009, but in April 2008, Shaun Woodward, Secretary of State for Northern Ireland announced that the scheduled 2009 district council elections were to be postponed until 2011. The first elections took place on 22 May 2014 and the council acted as a shadow authority until 1 April 2015.

Freedom of the Borough
The following people and military units have received the Freedom of the Borough of Mid and East Antrim.

Individuals
 Mrs. Joan Christie : 21 April 2018.
 Sir William Wright : 18 January 2019.

 Jonathan Rea : November 2020.

Military Units
 "B" Squadron Scottish and North Irish Yeomanry: 31 January 2016.

See also
 Local government in Northern Ireland

References

Districts of Northern Ireland, 2015-present
County Antrim